Jafarkhan-e Zeytun (also Romanized as Ja‘farkhān-e Zeytūn; also known as Ja‘farābād Khān-e Zeytūn and Zeytūn-e Vareh Zard) is a village in Kuhdasht-e Shomali Rural District, in the Central District of Kuhdasht County, Lorestan Province, Iran. At the 2006 census, its population was 57, in 20 families.

References 

Towns and villages in Kuhdasht County